The Vancouver Griffins were a professional women's ice hockey team in the National Women's Hockey League (NWHL). The team played its home games in Queen's Park Arena, in New Westminster, British Columbia, Canada.

History
The team was established in January 2000 by local businessman Phillip DeGrandpre. The Griffins were voted in by the NWHL in May 2000. The Griffins would become the first expansion team for the NWHL outside their traditional Ontario and Quebec base.

In 2000-01, the Vancouver Griffins played 18 exhibition games against Canadian Interuniversity Athletics Union (CIAU) teams, British Columbia and Alberta provincial women's teams, and NWHL teams. The first head coach of the Griffins was Sylvain Leone. The club’s first roster was selected at a training camp in August 2000 in Abbotsford, British Columbia. In the 2000-01 season, the only players that were not from British Columbia were goalie Krista Cloutier of Pickardville, Alberta, and forward Julia Berg, a member of the Norway women's national ice hockey team.

For the Griffins' 2001–02 season, the team was owned by British Columbia Sports Hall of Fame inductee Diane Nelson. The head coach was Nancy Wilson.  Olympians Nancy Drolet of Canada women's national ice hockey team, Cammi Granato) and Shelley Looney of the United States women's national ice hockey team joined Vancouver Griffins. The Griffins' roster also included Burnaby's own 18-year-old Natashia Pellatt, a graduate of Moscrop Secondary School. Other younger players included 15-year-old Courtney Unrah. The team played 31 exhibition games against local, CIAU, British Columbia and Alberta provincial women's teams, and NWHL teams. One of the highlights of the 2001-02 season was a victory over Hayley Wickenheiser and her Edmonton Chimos club by a 7-1 score. Nancy Drolet had a hat trick and Cammi Granato scored the other four goals against Edmonton.

The Griffins joined the Calgary Oval X-Treme and Edmonton Chimos as a fully scheduled three team division in the NWHL for the 2002-03 season. The Griffins disbanded at the end of that season.

Season-by-season

Note: GP = Games played, W = Wins, L = Losses, T = Ties, OTL = Overtime losses, GF = Goals for, GA = Goals against, Pts = Points.

Season standings

Inaugural Roster (2000-01)

References

External links
 NWHL website
 Vancouver Griffins in 2003 Esso Women's National
 Vancouver Griffins Logo
 Hockey British Columbia

National Women's Hockey League (1999–2007) teams
Women's ice hockey teams in Canada
Defunct ice hockey teams in Canada
Griffins
Ice hockey clubs established in 2000
2000 establishments in British Columbia
2003 disestablishments in British Columbia
Ice hockey clubs disestablished in 2003
Women in British Columbia